Whitesel Brothers is a historic warehouse located at Harrisonburg, Virginia. The original section was built in 1939, with later additions built between 1939 and 1948 and after 1961.  The original section is a two-story brick building, with a somewhat taller elevator tower.  It has a second-floor arched truss system and intact original mechanical systems.

It was listed on the National Register of Historic Places in 2005.

References

Commercial buildings on the National Register of Historic Places in Virginia
Commercial buildings completed in 1939
Buildings and structures in Harrisonburg, Virginia
National Register of Historic Places in Harrisonburg, Virginia
1939 establishments in Virginia